Intercession or intercessory prayer is the act of praying to a deity on behalf of others, or asking a saint in heaven to pray on behalf of oneself or for others.

The Apostle Paul's exhortation to Timothy specified that intercession prayers should be made for all people.

Christianity

In the early Church
The early Christians continued to practice intercessory prayer on behalf of others after Jesus' death. Ignatius of Antioch was one man who exhorted Christians to continue to pray for others, and especially for those who became Docetists or held other heretical beliefs. In his letter to the churches of Smyrna, St. Ignatius exhorts the Christians there to pray for other people: "only you must pray to God for them, if by any means they may be brought to repentance, which, however, will be very difficult. Yet Jesus Christ, who is our true life, has the power of [effecting] this". Throughout all of Ignatius's letters, the word for prayers of intercession appears nineteen times, and Ignatius asks for prayer "for himself (eight times), for the Christian church in Syria (seven times), for persecutors, heretics, and all people generally (once each)".

St. Ignatius and the other church fathers, such as Paul the Apostle, who were keen on intercessory prayer based this practice on Jesus' own teachings which required that one pray for others, especially one's enemies:

According to Lionel Swain, of St. Edmund's College, Ware, St. Paul believed intercession to be one of the most important aspects of faith and praying life, as praying for others is a recurring theme in his works. Prayer acts as a way for St. Paul to acknowledge God's power. Intercessory prayer also acts as a way for the Apostle to "share in ... the Father's redemptive love". Paul believed that prayer transformed the person doing the praying, as much as the one being prayed for, which creates a stronger bond between him and God.

Prof. Dr Johannes van Oort, Professor Extraordinarius in the Department of Church History and Church Polity of the Faculty of Theology at the University of Pretoria, South Africa, adds that, in addition to praying for wisdom, the early church was very much involved with different charismas, one of which being healing. Praying for other people's illnesses was another way that intercessory prayer was important in the early church, as healing was a sign of "the power of God's Kingdom". This gift of healing is specifically mentioned, among the other charismata, as a sign of being a true Christian by Irenaeus of Lyons in his text, Against Heresies. SUIIIIII

Saints
Intercession of the saints is a doctrine held by the Eastern Orthodox, Oriental Orthodox and Roman Catholic Churches that saints may be asked to intercede (or pray) for others. The doctrine of requesting intercession from saints can be found in Christian writings from the 3rd century AD, such as from Origen and Clement of Alexandria.

The dead

In addition to praying for each other in life, early Christians would pray for those who had died. There is no unequivocal evidence that Christians began to pray for the dead before the third century AD. G. F. Hamilton argues that the earliest example of Church prayer on behalf of dead Christians are found in the Sacramentary of Serapion of Thmuis (350 AD). Rather than pray for the departed in regular church services on Sunday, these early Christians would hold special commemorative occasions during the week. There was a sharp distinction drawn between remembering and praying on behalf of the dead, and those who were the faithfully' departed", where Christians would only pray for those who had died as believers. The First Epistle of Clement (95 AD) contains a prayer which, while mainly for protection for the living, also includes the dead. Even quite early, a distinction was drawn between those who had died as Christians, and those who had died as unbelievers. In the Martyrdom of Polycarp (155 AD), Polycarp is killed and his bones are taken by fellow Christians and a shrine is set up to him, where they may remember his martyrdom. In contrast, the "Apology of Aristides" shows how those who were not Christians were grieved for, while the dead faithful were rejoiced over.

Theological perspective
In an article in Theological Studies, Catholic theologian Patricia A. Sullivan warns that saints should not be built up in a way that brings down God. Saint Augustine had famously said that we pray not to instruct God but to get our will in line with God's. Sullivan warns away from the dictionary meanings of "intercession" as “intervention, mediation, arbitration, negotiation”, all of which sound like we are dealing with a hostile or unfriendly God, whom we need to manipulate to get what we need. Such is not the meaning of the hapax legomenon in the New Testament of the word for intercession. Sullivan goes on:
When we ask a saint to intercede for us, what is happening at a deeper level is that we are taking refuge in the all-enfolding community of the redeemed, approaching God thru saintly symbols of Christ's victory and of our hope. Saints want always what God wants, what is best for us whether we pray for it or not. They are in a perpetual attitude of praise for God’s love and care, to which we join ourselves, praying, more precisely, with them rather than to them. The value of our petitions is that they turn us in confidence toward the God who loves us, allowing God’s work to be more effective in us, and thru us in others.
It would be anathema to ask God to try any harder to do good. By invocation of a saint "we take refuge in faith in the all-enfolding community of all the redeemed," where "each is responsible for all". They are "creative models of holiness".

Islam

Although the idea of intercession or mediation (Arabic: s̲h̲afāʿa) has historically played a very prominent role in Islamic thought, it is not universally accepted by all Muslims in the present day.

The Quran says that the pre-Islamic Arab pagan gods will not be able to intercede with God on behalf of humankind, and that "the guilty" (al-mujrimīn, Q74:41) will not benefit from any intercession on the Day of Judgment. Other passages that deny the efficacy intercession include Q32:4 & Q39:44. Still others say that God is the only intercessor (Q6:51, Q6:70; Q32:4; Q39:44).

However, "intercession is mentioned in the Qurʾān with respect to angels praying for the believers and the Prophet praying for erring but repentant Muslims." Furthermore, it became an orthodox Islamic doctrine or "cardinal belief" that "Muḥammad will intercede for all Muslims on the Day of Resurrection." While this particular tenet practically remained unchallenged throughout Islamic history, the widespread Sunni and Shia practice of asking deceased prophets and saints for intercession by praying at their tombs have become contentious issues in the modern Islamic world, with all these different types of intercession often being labelled by Salafi/Wahhabi Muslims as a type of polytheism, in a manner akin to the attitude of many Protestants towards the Catholic and Eastern Orthodox practice of saint-intercession.

Studies

Some religions claim that praying for somebody who is sick can have positive effects on the health of the person being prayed for.

Meta-studies of the literature in the field have been performed showing evidence only for no effect or a potentially small effect. For instance, a 2006 meta analysis on 14 studies concluded that there is "no discernible effect" while a 2007 systemic review of intercessory prayer reported inconclusive results, noting that 7 of 17 studies had "small, but significant, effect sizes" but the review noted that the most methodologically rigorous studies failed to produce significant findings.

See also

 Episcopal intercession
 Faith healing
 Feast of the Intercession
 Intercession of Christ
 Intercession of the Theotokos
 Prayer warrior

References

External links

 Catholic Encyclopedia: Intercession

Prayer
Christian terminology

de:Fürbitte